A chart pattern or price pattern is a pattern within a chart when prices are graphed. In stock and commodity markets trading, chart pattern studies play a large role during technical analysis. When data is plotted there is usually a pattern which naturally occurs and repeats over a period. Chart patterns are used as either reversal or continuation signals.

There are three main types of chart patterns which are used by technical analysts: 
 traditional chart pattern
 Harmonic Patterns
 candlestick pattern

Traditional Chart Pattern 
Included in this type are the most common patterns  which have been introduced to chartists for more than a hundred years. Below is a list of the most commonly used traditional chart patterns:

Reversal Patterns:

 Double Top Reversal 
 Double Bottom Reversal
 Triple Top Reversal 
 Triple Bottom Reversal
 Head and Shoulders
 Key Reversal Bar

Continuation Patterns:

 Triangle
 Flag and Pennant
 Channel
 Cup with Handle

Harmonic Pattern 
Harmonic Pattern utilizes the recognition of specific structures that possess distinct and consecutive Fibonacci ratio alignments that quantify and validate harmonic patterns. These patterns calculate the Fibonacci aspects of these price structures to identify highly probable reversal points in the financial markets. This methodology assumes that harmonic patterns or cycles, like many patterns and cycles in life, continually repeat. The key is to identify these patterns and to enter or to exit a position based upon a high degree of probability that the same historic price action will occur.

Below is a list of commonly used harmonic patterns:

 Bat
 Butterfly
 Gartley
 Crab
 Deep Crab
 Shark
 3 Drives
 AB=CD
 5-0

Traders use the Potential Reversal Zone (PRZ) as an important level of support/resistance in their trading and price action strategy.

Candlestick Pattern 
In technical analysis, a candlestick pattern is a movement in prices shown graphically on a candlestick chart that some believe can predict a particular market movement. The recognition of the pattern is subjective and programs that are used for charting have to rely on predefined rules to match the pattern. There are 42 recognized patterns that can be split into simple and complex patterns.

Steve Nison is the person who introduced candlesticks to the West. There are hundreds of candlestick pattern available which are discussed in Steve's book Japanese Candlestick Charting Techniques.

See also
 Candlestick chart
 Elliot wave
 Market trends
 Price action trading
 Trend following

References

Technical analysis
Chart patterns